Chittamo is an unincorporated community located in the town of Frog Creek, Washburn County, Wisconsin, United States.

History
It is named for the Ojibwe word for "squirrel," which was also the name of an important Ojibwe leader who lived in the area.

Notes

Unincorporated communities in Washburn County, Wisconsin
Unincorporated communities in Wisconsin